The following highways have been numbered 919:

United States